The Highland Railway was one of the smaller British railways before the Railways Act 1921, operating north of Perth railway station in Scotland and serving the farthest north of Britain. It continued to expand, reaching Wick and Thurso in the north and Kyle of Lochalsh in the west, eventually serving the counties of Caithness, Sutherland, Ross & Cromarty, Inverness, Perth, Nairn, Moray and Banff. Southward it connected with the Caledonian Railway at Stanley Junction, north of Perth, and eastward with the Great North of Scotland Railway at Boat of Garten, Elgin, Keith and Portessie.

Although its shorter branches have closed, former Highland Railway lines remain open from Inverness to Wick and Thurso, Kyle of Lochalsh, Keith (as part of the Aberdeen to Inverness Line), as well as the direct main line south to Perth.

Main line
The Highland Railway main line between Inverness and Perth, which opened in 1863, left the Caledonian Railway at Stanley and then ran north over the Grampian Mountains.

Aberfeldy branch
The Aberfeldy branch left the main line at Ballinluig. The line opened on 3 July 1865 and was closed to passengers on 3 May 1965.

Keith and Aviemore to Inverness

Portessie branch

Fochabers branch

Burghead and Hopeman branch

Findhorn branch
An independent company built and opened the railway, and the line was taken over by the Inverness & Aberdeen Junction Railway 1862. The line was closed by the Highland in 1869.

Fort George branch

Far North Line
The Far North Line between Inverness and Wick and Thurso opened in stages between 1862 and 1874. As well as the Kyle of Lochalsh Line that branches at Dingwell, the Black Isle Branch left at Muir of Ord for Fortrose, the Dornoch Light Railway left at The Mound for Dornoch and the Wick & Lybster Light Railway ran from Wick to Lybster.

Black Isle branch

Dornoch Light Railway

Georgemas Branch

Wick & Lybster Light Railway

Kyle of Lochalsh Line

The Kyle of Lochalsh Line leaves the Far North Line at Dingwall. Between 1885 and 1946 a branch left the line at Fodderty Junction,  from Perth. The line was diverted in 1954, as part of a hydro electric project that raised the level of Loch Luichart, the distances are measured from Perth via this new line.

Strathpeffer Branch

Invergarry & Fort Augustus Railway
The Invergarry & Fort Augustus Railway was an isolated branch from  that was worked by the Highland from when it opened in 1903 until 1 May 1907, when the North British Railway took over.

Notes and references

Footnotes

References

Sources

External links

 The Highland Railway Society
 The Highland Railway, includes a map of the system

Highland Railway